Calone or methylbenzodioxepinone, trade-named Calone 1951, also known in the industry as "watermelon ketone", was discovered by Pfizer in 1966. It is used to give the olfactory impression of a fresh seashore through the marine and ozone nuances. Calone is similar in structure to brown algae pheromones like ectocarpene and is also distantly related in structure to the benzodiazepine class of sedatives.
 
Calone is an unusual chemical compound which has an intense "sea-breeze" note with slight floral and fruit overtones. It has been used as a scent component since the 1980s for its watery, fresh, ozone accords, and as a more dominant note in several perfumes of the marine trend, beginning in the 1990s. In 2014, Plummer et al.  reported the synthesis and fragrance properties of several related aliphatic analogues.

References

External links 
 Constituents of fragrances
 Watermelon ketone

Perfume ingredients
Ketones
Benzodioxepines